Kerry Group plc is a public food company headquartered in Ireland. It is quoted on the Dublin ISEQ and London stock exchanges.

Given the company's origins in the co-operative movement, farmer-suppliers of the company retain a significant interest in the company. Kerry Co-operative Creameries  remains the largest single shareholder in the company as of 2022.

History 
Kerry was founded in 1972 in Listowel, County Kerry as a private company (North Kerry Milk Products) with three shareholders – state-owned Dairy Disposal Company (42.5%), a federation of eight small farmer co-operatives in Kerry (42.5%) and Erie Casein Company Inc. from the US (15%).

In 1986, a significant milestone in the formation of the plc involved the Group acquiring the undertaking, property and assets of Kerry Co-operative Creameries and as a consideration 90 million ordinary shares in Kerry Group plc being issued to the Co-op.

In March 2004, the company bought the Quest Food Ingredients Group, a food ingredients business, for US$440 million. Then in August 2005, the company acquired Noon Products, a supplier of Indian and Thai ready meals, for £124m.

In September 2012, the company acquired Cargill Flavor Systems, a manufacturer of food flavouring, for $230 million.

In February 2015 the company acquired Rollover, a supplier of hot dogs. Then in October 2015 the company acquired Red Arrow Products, Island Oasis and Wellmune, three businesses in the US taste and nutrition sector, for US$735 million.

In June 2021 Pilgrim's Pride agreed to buy Kerry Group's consumer foods meat and meals business. Also in June 2021, Kerry Group agreed to acquire Niacet, a global leader in preservation, for the value of €853 million.

In July 2021, the company acquired Biosearch Life, a biotechnology company focused on providing innovative solutions for the pharmaceutical, nutraceutical and functional food sectors.

In February 2022, Kerry Group announced two acquisitions: c-LEcta, a leading biotechnology innovation company, and Enmex, a Mexican based enzyme manufacturer.

In April 2022, Kerry Group acquired Natreon, Inc, a leading US based supplier of branded Ayurvedic botanical ingredients.

In August 2022, Kerry Group acquired the B2B powdered cheese business and related assets of The Kraft Heinz Company for consideration of $107.5 million.

In January 2023, IRCA, Advent International’s portfolio company, agreed to buy Kerry Group’s Sweet Ingredients Portfolio for €500 million.

Operations 
Headquartered in Tralee, County Kerry, Ireland, the Group employs over 23,000 people in its manufacturing, sales and technical centres worldwide. Kerry's global Technology Centre is in Naas, County Kildare at the groups' €100 million Global Technology and Innovation Centre which employs 800 people. Kerry supplies over 18,000 foods, food ingredients and flavour products to customers in more than 140 countries worldwide. Kerry is a member of the European Flavour Association.

Business structure 
The Group operates across two business:

 Taste & Nutrition
 Kerry Dairy Ireland

Notable brands 
Brands include:

 Big Train
 Island Oasis
 DaVinci Gourmet
 Golden Dipt
 Ravifruit

Rankings 
In 2021, Kerry was on the list of Industry Outlook's Top 10 Food Additive Manufacturers, in addition to being ranked second on the Top 20 Global Food Preservative Companies list by FoodTalks, a Chinese food media platform.

See also 
List of companies of Ireland

References

External links 
Official website

 
Food companies of the Republic of Ireland
Companies listed on Euronext Dublin
Flavor companies
Former cooperatives
Demutualized organizations
Tralee
Food and drink companies established in 1972
Irish companies established in 1972